Remington Historic District is a national historic district located at Remington, Fauquier County, Virginia.  It encompasses 131 contributing buildings, 1 contributing site, and 2 contributing structures in the rural village of Remington.  The district consists primarily of late-19th- and early-20th-century
dwellings, churches, and commercial buildings that illustrate the town's growth and development.  Notable buildings include the Rouse House (c. 1850), Remington Methodist Church (1872), St. Luke's Episcopal Church (1881), Remington Baptist Church (1884), the Daniels House (c. 1888), Remington Farmer's Co-op Building (c. 1903), Groves Hardware Building (1905), and the State Bank of Remington (1913).

It was listed on the National Register of Historic Places in 2005.

References

Historic districts in Fauquier County, Virginia
Greek Revival architecture in Virginia
National Register of Historic Places in Fauquier County, Virginia
Historic districts on the National Register of Historic Places in Virginia